Mähri Pirgulyýewa (Turkmen Cyrillic: Мәхри Пиргулыева, ; ; born 11 March 1988), known by her stage name Mýähri, is a Turkmen hip-hop singer.

Biography 
She studied at Ashgabat Turkish Anatolian High School. In 2007, she cooperated with the producer Nikolay Yakimov for the release of album Seňki däl. This was followed by her album Söýgi wagty geldi. The nationalistic track Eziz Watanym ("My Precious Homeland") from the album was heavily promoted on local radio stations. Other nationalistic songs include Öňe, Diňe Öňe, Türkmenistanym and so forth. However Mähri remains best known for her song Aýterek Günterek ("The Moon Tree and the Sun Tree").

In 2018, she won the Grand Prix of the popular youth music contest "Ýylyň parlak ýyldyzy" ("The Brightest Star of the Year") in Turkmenistan, where she performed a song she composed herself, "Alaja".

In January 2020, she released a new music album, "Ýyldyz" ("The Star").

Graduate of Turkmen National Institute of World Languages named after Dovletmammet Azady.

Discography

References

External links
Mähri on Instagram
 Presentation of Yyldyz album

Turkmenistan women singers
Living people
People from Ashgabat
21st-century Turkmenistan singers
21st-century Turkmenistan women
21st-century women singers
Women songwriters
1988 births